So Fresh: The Hits of Spring 2011 is an Australian compilation album. The album was the #2 compilation of the year and was certified platinum. The album was released on 9 September 2011.

Track listing
CD
Gotye featuring Kimbra – "Somebody That I Used to Know" (4:04)
Maroon 5 featuring Christina Aguilera – "Moves like Jagger" (3:21)
Jessica Mauboy – "Inescapable" (3:34)
Nicki Minaj – "Super Bass" (3:20)
LMFAO featuring Natalia Kills – "Champagne Showers" (4:23)
Rihanna – "Cheers (Drink to That)" (4:00)
Lady Gaga – "The Edge of Glory" (4:21)
Calvin Harris featuring Kelis – "Bounce" (3:38)
Aloe Blacc – "I Need a Dollar" (4:03)
Hot Chelle Rae – "Tonight Tonight" (3:18)
Example – "Changed the Way You Kiss Me" (3:12)
Marvin Priest featuring Wynter Gordon – Take Me Away" (3:49)
Chris Brown – "She Ain't You" (4:06)
Jessie J – "Nobody's Perfect" (3:41)
Britney Spears – "I Wanna Go" (3:30)
The Black Eyed Peas – "Don't Stop the Party" (3:59)
Benny Benassi featuring Gary Go – "Cinema" (3:01)
Avril Lavigne – "Smile" (3:27)
Pete Murray – "Always a Winner" (4:11)
Jack Vidgen – "Yes I Am" (3:34)

DVD
Gotye featuring Kimbra – "Somebody That I Used to Know"
Jessica Mauboy – "Inescapable"
Nicki Minaj – "Super Bass"
Calvin Harris featuring Kelis – "Bounce"
Aloe Blacc – "I Need a Dollar"
Hot Chelle Rae – "Tonight Tonight"
Example – "Changed the Way You Kiss Me"
Marvin Priest featuring Wynter Gordon – "Take Me Away"
Chris Brown – "She Ain't You"
Jessie J – "Nobody's Perfect"
Benny Benassi featuring Gary Go – "Cinema"
Pete Murray – "Always a Winner"

External links
So Fresh: The Hits Of Spring 2011

References

So Fresh albums
2011 compilation albums
2011 in Australian music